Meridulia meridana is a species of moth of the family Tortricidae and is endemic to Venezuela.

The ground colour of the forewings is reddish, sprinkled with grey and strigulated (finely streaked) with rust red. The hindwings are creamy white with grey strigulation in the apex area.

Etymology
The species name refers to the state of Mérida in Venezuela.

References

External links

Moths described in 2006
Endemic fauna of Venezuela
Moths of South America
Euliini
Taxa named by Józef Razowski